Sir John Leman High School is a coeducational 11–18 secondary school with academy status serving part of the Waveney region in north Suffolk, England. The school is located on the western edge of the town of Beccles and serves the surrounding area, including Worlingham. Pupils from Norfolk villages such as Gillingham and Broome also sometimes attend the school. The school has approximately 1,400 pupils, including a sixth form of around 260 students.

History
The school was established when locally-born merchant Sir John Leman left money in his will of 1631 which, after his death on 6 March 1632, provided for the education of 44 pupils from Beccles, two from Ringsfield and two from Gillingham. In 1914 it became the County Mixed Grammar School on its present site in Ringsfield Road. The old school has been converted into the Beccles Museum. In 1971 the school became a comprehensive high school and grew in size. In recent years building work has gone on to expand the school.

Until September 2012 the school only took 13- to 18-year-olds. Due to the reorganisation of schools in Suffolk it now takes 11- to 18-year-olds. Years 7 and 8 temporarily went to the Lower School site on Castle Hill, previously the Beccles Middle School site. This site was occupied by the Beccles Free School in 2014 when it moved from Carlton Colville.

Ofsted reports
In the Ofsted inspection report dated February 2006 it was rated as a 'good' school with a 'good' sixth form. In February 2009 it was again rated as a generally 'good' school, although with some features which were judged 'satisfactory'. The sixth form provision was judged as achieved an overall effectiveness of 'satisfactory', although post-16 curriculum provision was judged 'good'. The school's subsequent inspection reports again graded it as 'good' overall in October 2011 and October 2016.

Academic performance 
The school's 2016 GCSE results were overall above average for England with a Progress 8 score of +0.32. 65% of students achieved grades A*-C in GCSE English and Maths. The 2016 A-Level results were in line with the national average, with a progress score of +0.05 and an average grade of C.

Notable former pupils
 Joseph Arnold, naval surgeon and naturalist
 Joan Crowfoot Payne, archaeologist and sister of Dorothy Hodgkin
 Dorothy Hodgkin, who won the Nobel prize in Chemistry entered the school in 1921 before studying chemistry at Somerville College, Oxford.
Lin Homer (born 4 March 1957) British Civil Servant, Chief Executive HM Revenue & Customs.
 Sir Francis Avery Jones, eminent gasteroenterologist 
 Chris Martin, striker for Derby County
 Sir John Mills, actor
 Sir Stanley Rous, the 6th President of FIFA and secretary of the Football Association attended Sir John Leman school in the period before the First World War.
 Jennifer Westwood, author, broadcaster and folklorist

References

External links
Official site
 SJLHS Kenya Exchange site

Academies in Suffolk
Secondary schools in Suffolk
Educational institutions established in the 1630s
1631 establishments in England
Beccles